The Tesla next-generation vehicle is an upcoming battery electric car under development by Tesla. The unnamed next-generation vehicle will be the third mainstream platform for the company and it is expected that production volumes will greatly surpass those of the  Model 3/Y platform.

The vehicle will take advantage of Tesla advanced production concepts such as large single-unit castings and a structural battery pack utilizing the 4680 battery cells. It is expected to cost considerably less to manufacture and sell for approximately half of Tesla's existing lowest cost vehicles.

The car will be manufactured at the Gigafactory Mexico facility, on which construction was announced in March 2023, and which will also be used to build subsequent vehicles based on the same platform. Other manufacturing locations are expected, but volume production is not expected until late 2024 or 2025.

History 
Tesla has made public statements about another mainstream electric car product that would follow the Model Y and would be considerably cheaper than the Model 3. By October 2022, the company stated that the Tesla engineering team had turned its focus to it and that it would be half the price of the Model 3/Y platform.

The car is frequently referred to by the automotive media as the "$25,000 Tesla" but the time when it would come to market has consistently been unclear.
The next-generation platform was mentioned in Tesla's 2022 financial report as under development, but provided no information about specific cars that might be built on the platform.

In March 2023, the company clarified that the cars would be built faster and with fewer rare-Earth materials. The new powertrain is expected to be both more efficient and cost less to build, but power, torque and speed were not discussed.
The design for the platform was stated to require 75% less silicon carbide than existing Teslas, would support any battery chemistry, and that various manufacturing synergies would enable a halving of the factory footprint. The drive unit is expected to cost approximately $1000 and contain no rare earth minerals. All controllers would be designed by Tesla.

In March 2023, Tesla confirmed the Gigafactory Mexico facility would be used to build Tesla's next-generation vehicle, and subsequent vehicles on the same platform.

References 

2020s cars
Electric car models
Tesla, Inc. vehicles